Thryptomene eremaea is a species of flowering plant in the family Myrtaceae and is endemic to Western Australia. It is an erect shrub with upward-pointing, oval leaves and white or pale pink flowers with five petals and ten irregularly arranged stamens.

Description
There are usually ten, irregularly arranged stamens. Flowering occurs from July to December.

Taxonomy
Thryptomene eremaea was first formally described in 2001 by Barbara Lynette Rye and Malcolm Eric Trudgen in the journal Nuytsia from specimens collected by D.J. Pearson near Queen Victoria Spring in 1992. The specific epithet (eremaea) refers to the species' distribution in the Eremaean botanical province.

Distribution and habitat
This thryptomene grows in mallee shrubland on sandplains, sometimes over granite and is found between Menzies and Queen Victoria Spring in the Great Victoria Desert and Murchison biogeographic regions.

Conservation status
Thryptomene eremaea is classified as "Priority Two" by the Western Australian Government Department of Parks and Wildlife meaning that it is poorly known and from only one or a few locations.

References

eremaea
Endemic flora of Western Australia
Rosids of Western Australia
Vulnerable flora of Australia
Plants described in 2001
Taxa named by Barbara Lynette Rye
Taxa named by Malcolm Eric Trudgen